The name Raymond has been used for five tropical cyclones worldwide.

Eastern Pacific: 
 Hurricane Raymond (1983), tied with Hurricane Kiko for the strongest tropical cyclone of the 1983 Pacific hurricane season
 Hurricane Raymond (1989), the strongest tropical cyclone of the 1989 Pacific hurricane season
 Hurricane Raymond (2013), the strongest tropical cyclone of the 2013 Pacific hurricane season
 Tropical Storm Raymond (2019), short-lived tropical storm which dissipated without affecting land

Australian Region: 
 Cyclone Raymond (2005), made landfall on the northern coast of Australia 

Pacific hurricane set index articles
Australian region cyclone set index articles